The Américas Award for Children’s and Young Adult Literature is literary award presented annually that recognizes high quality "children’s and young adult books that portray Latin America, the Caribbean, or Latinos in the United States, and to provide teachers with recommendations for classroom use." It was first awarded in 1993 by the Consortium of Latin American Studies Programs (CLASP). The award is presented annually at a ceremony at the Library of Congress during Hispanic Heritage Month, along with coordinating workshops for teachers.

History 
The Américas Award was proposed in 1992 within the Teaching and Outreach Committee of the Consortium of Latin American Studies Programs. Julie Kline, at the University of Wisconsin–Milwaukee, served as the committee chair for the first 3 years of the award and then went on to be the award coordinator for many years. Coordination for the award later moved to Latin American Studies centers at Tulane and Vanderbilt Universities. A full research collection of all winning, honor, and commended titles is kept and maintained by the University of Wisconsin–Milwaukee at the Golda Meir Library.

Criteria and Eligibility
The award judges will evaluate books based on 
 Distinctive literary quality;  
 Cultural contextualization; 
 Exceptional integration of text, illustration and design; 
 Potential for classroom use. 

In order to be eligible for the award, a title must meet the following criteria:
 The book must be published in the preceding year.
 The title may be for primary or secondary reading levels.
 Language of publication may be English, Spanish, Portuguese, or any language indigenous to the Americas.
 The book must be published in the United States or by a publisher with offices within the U.S.
 Submissions may be fiction, poetry, folklore, or selected non-fiction.
 A book will only be considered in its first year of publication in the United States. A book originally published in the U.S. in English with a translated edition in a subsequent year will only be eligible the first year of the edition.

Recipients

Recipients of Multiple Awards and Honors

Multiple Américas Awards
One person's works have received four Américas Awards:
 Margarita Engle, as author in 2006, 2009, 2012, and 2015.

One person's works have received three Américas Awards:
Duncan Tonatiuh, as author and illustrator in 2015, 2018, and 2019.

Multiple people's works have won two Américas Awards: 
 As author and illustrator: Yuyi Morales.
 As author: Julia Alvarez, Monica Brown, Juan Felipe Herrera, Francisco Jiménez, Lynn Joseph and Pam Muñoz Ryan.

Multiple Américas Honors
Multiple people's works have received two honors: 
 As author and illustrator: Maya Christina González, Yuyi Morales, and  Duncan Tonatiuh
 As illustrator David Díaz
 As author: Margarita Engle, Judith Ortiz Cofer, and Laura Resau

Multiple Américas Commendations
Different works by the same authors or illustrators have received commendations in the same year.

Two people's work has received commendations nine times:
 George Ancona as both author and illustrator in 1994, 1995, 1998, 1999, 2000, 2001, 2003, 2007-2008, and 2011.
 Maya Christina González as illustrator twice in 1997, and once 1998, 1999, 2001, 2002, 2007-2008, and 2009; and as author and illustrator in 2007-2008.

Three people's work has received commendations eight times:
 Jorge Argueta as author in 2003, twice in 2006, 2007-2008, 2010, 2011, 2016, and 2017.
 Margarita Engle as author in 2010, 2014, twice in 2016, 2017, twice in 2018, and 2019.
 Gary Soto as author in 1995, twice in 1997, twice in 1998, 2003, 2006, and 2009.

Two people's work has received commendations seven times:
 Alma Flor Ada as author in 1995, twice in 1997, 1998, 2002, and 2016.
 Pat Mora as author in 1996, 1997, 2002, twice in 2010, and 2011.

Two people's works have received commendations six times:
 David Díaz as illustrator in 1996, 2000, 2002, 2010, 2011, and 2016.
 Enrique O. Sánchez as illustrator in 1993, 1994, twice in 1996, 1997, and 1999.

Four people's works have received commendations five times:
 Francisco X. Alarcón as author in 1997, 1998, 1999, 2001, and 2009.
 Monica Brown as author in 2007-2008, 2010, 2014, 2016, and 2018.
 Raúl Colón as illustrator in 1997, 2005, 2007-2008, and twice in 2015.
 Francisco X. Stork as author in 2006, 2010, 2011, 2017, and 2018.

Eight people's works have received commendations four times:
 Lori Marie Carlson as author in 1994, 1996, 2005, and 2009.
 Lulu Delacre as illustrator in 1994 and 1997; as author in 1996; and author and illustrator in 2000.
 Domi as illustrator in 2006, 2006, 2009, and 2011.
 Arthur Dorros as author and illustrator in 1993 and 1995, and as author in 2005 and 2015.
 Tony Johnston	as author in 1994, 1997, 2001, and 2010.
 Rafael López as illustrator in 2010, 2014, 2016, and 2018.
 Edel Rodríguez as illustrator in 2001, 2010, and twice in 2016.
 Benjamin Alire Sáenz as author in twice in 2009, 2013, and 2018. 

Twenty people's works have received commendations three times:
 Rudolfo Anaya as author in 1995, 2000, and 2004.
 Carmen T. Bernier-Grand as author in 1994, 2007-2008, and 2010.
 Robert Casilla as illustrator in 1993, 1996, and 2004.
 Joe Cepeda as illustrator in 1998, 2007-2008, and 2011.
 René Colato Laínez as author in 2010, 2011, and 2017. 
 Amy Córdova as illustrator in 2004, 2009, and 2011.
 Tomie dePaola as author and illustrator in 1994, and as illustrator in 1994 and 1999.
 Luis Garay as illustrator in 1996 and 2007-2008, and as author and illustrator in 1997.
 Phillis Gershator as author twice in 1994 and once in 1998.
 Juan Felipe Herrera as author in 1995, 2002, and 2015. 
 Francisco Jiménez as author in 1998, 2000, and 2009.
 Elisa Kleven as illustrator in 1994 and 1997, and author and illustrator in 1996. 
 Georgina Lázaro as author in 2009, 2010, and 2018.
 Frané Lessac as author and illustrator in 1994, and as illustrator in 1994 and 2013.
 Meg Medina as author in 2014, 2017, and 2019.
 Roseanne Greenfield Thong as author in 2014 and twice in 2015. 
 Duncan Tonatiuh as author and illustrator in 2011 and 2017, and as illustrator in 2016.
 Beatriz Vidal as illustrator in 1998, 2002, and 2018.
 Jeanette Winter as illustrator in 1997, and as author and illustrator in 2007-2008 and 2011.
 Rafael Yockteng as illustrator in 2002, 2010, and 2016.

Multiple people's work has received two commendations: 
 As author and illustrator: Angela Dominguez, Laura Lacámara, Yuyi Morales, and Leyla Torres.
 As illustrator: Jamel Akib, Renato Alarcão, Andrea Arroyo, Martha Avilés, Claire B. Cotts, Felipe Dávalos, Carla Golembe, Ann Grifalconi, Holly Meade, John Parra, Raúl the Third, Alfonso Ruano, Synthia Saint James, Elivia Savadier, Simón Silva.
 As author: Eve Bunting, Cathy Camper, Teresa Cárdenas, Pablo Cartaya, Omar S. Castañeda,  Matt de la Peña, Campbell Geeslin, Mary-Joan Gerson, Lucía M. González, Rigoberta Menchú, Jose-Luis Orozco, Amada Irma Pérez, Isabel Quintero, Vashanti Rahaman, Antonio Ramírez, Laura Resau, Roni Capin Rivera-Ashford, Carmen Tafolla, Erika Tamar, Nancy Van Laan, and Jonah Winter.

References 

Awards established in 1993
Children's literary awards
Young adult literature awards
Latin American literary awards
Hispanic and Latino American culture
American children's literary awards
Literary awards honoring minority groups
Hispanic and Latino American literature